FK Proleter Novi Sad is a defunct football club based in Novi Sad, Vojvodina, Serbia. They competed in the Serbian SuperLiga for four seasons between 2018 and 2022, before merging with RFK Novi Sad 1921.

History
Founded in 1951, the club won the Serbian League Vojvodina in the 2008–09 season and took promotion to the Serbian First League. They spent the following nine years in the second tier of Serbian football, before winning the title and earning promotion to the Serbian SuperLiga for the first time in their history. During this period, the club also reached the Serbian Cup round of 16 on five occasions. They would finish in eight place in their debut appearance in the top flight. After spending four seasons in the Serbian SuperLiga, the club suffered relegation in 2021–22, before merging with RFK Novi Sad 1921.

Honours
Serbian First League (Tier 2)
 2017–18
Serbian League Vojvodina (Tier 3)
 2008–09

Seasons

Notable players
This is a list of players who have played at full international level.

  Artur Yedigaryan
  Predrag Bošnjak
  Mirko Ivanić
  Aleksandar Andrejević
  Željko Brkić
  Nemanja Čović
  Marko Ilić
  Branislav Jovanović
  Andrija Kaluđerović
  Milan Makarić
  Aleksa Pejić
  Emil Rockov

For a list of all FK Proleter Novi Sad players with a Wikipedia article, see :Category:FK Proleter Novi Sad players.

Managerial history

References

External links
 
 Club page at Srbijasport

 
1951 establishments in Serbia
2022 disestablishments in Serbia
Association football clubs disestablished in 2022
Association football clubs established in 1951
Defunct football clubs in Serbia
Football clubs in Vojvodina
Football clubs in Novi Sad
2022 mergers and acquisitions